Prospect Fighting Championships or PFC is a Canadian mixed martial arts promotion based in London, Ontario, Canada. Established in 2013, it is the oldest active promotion in the province. It was formerly known as the Provincial Fighting Championship (Provincial FC) before rebranding in 2015. It provides talent for the UFC as a feeder organization. In 2020, the promotion signed a deal with Fight Network to stream on their broadcast service.

History
Founded in 2013, by Jamie Champion, the Provincial Fighting Championship held three events in the province of Ontario, before rebranding to Prospect Fighting Championships (PFC) in 2015. It started off by running amateur (PAFC) events in Ontario's blossoming MMA scene, as Mixed Martial Arts were considered illegal until 2010. With the only mixed martial arts events occurring in the province before 2010, being hosted on native reservations. These communities possess their own athletic commission, so they were able to bypass provincial law. The Prospect Fighting Championships uses a UFC-spec octagon as their cage and adheres to the Unified Rules of Mixed Martial Arts. The promotion offers a wide variety of weight classes to its athletes ranging from Atomweight to Super Heavyweight, this grants fighters of all weights the chance to compete and improve their skills.

The commentary team for the PFC is led by John Ramdeen, a veteran broadcaster in Canada's mixed martial arts community. He is joined by former mixed martial arts fighter, Robin Black, who acts as the promotions lead analyst. The commentary team has also previously included Reed Duffy. Following PFC 13, the official ring announcer for the Prospect Fighting Championships was announced to be veteran voice, Keith Crawford. Pete "Mr. Throwdown" Treviño has formerly acted as the announcer for the promotion prior to 2022. The organization has also hosted three WAKO sanctioned kickboxing events. Over the last decade the PFC has grown into one of the largest promotions in Ontario, switching back to the professional Mixed Martial Arts circuit after 2018. Since its inception, the promotion has held 19 events, involving over 140 matches and 31 kickboxing bouts.

Provincial Fighting Championship

On Saturday, October 26, 2013. Provincial Fighting Championship held their inaugural event in London, Ontario, Canada. The promotion ran four events under the Provincial FC banner, before rebranding to Prospect Fighting Championships in 2015.

Events

Prospect Fighting Championships

On Saturday, August 29, 2015. Prospect Fighting Championships held its first event in London, Ontario, Canada. Since then the organization has hosted six AMMA events and three WAKO sanctioned kickboxing events before switching back to the professional MMA circuit. Since the rebrand, it has held 14 events, all in Ontario. The promotion continues the use of a UFC-spec octagon and operates under the Unified Rules of Mixed Martial Arts. The commentary team for the PFC is hosted by John Ramdeen and former mixed martial arts fighter, Robin Black. Keith Crawford acts as the announcer for the Prospect Fighting Championships.

The company holds annual events in conjunction with London-based fundraiser, Showdown in the Downtown, to support fundraising to "fight" kidney disease. In 2020, the promotion signed a deal with Fight Network streaming services. With the COVID-19 lockdown in Ontario preventing live shows in late 2020–2021, the promotion hosted a virtual talk show on September 25, 2021. It featured former UFC fighter Brendan Schaub, the event resulted in over $300,000 being raised for local charities. In total the events have raised an accumulative 2.4 million dollars for charity.

Events

Events

Scheduled events

Past events

Champions

Kickboxing Champions

PFC Super Heavyweight Championship
121 kg+ (266 lb+)

PFC Heavyweight Championship
120 kg (265 lb)

PFC Light Heavyweight Championship
92 kg (205 lb)

PFC Middleweight Championship
84 kg (185 lb)

PFC Welterweight Championship
77 kg (170 lb)

PFC Lightweight Championship
70 kg (155 lb)

PFC Featherweight Championship
66 kg (145 lb)

PFC Bantamweight Championship
61 kg (135 lb)

PFC Flyweight Championship
57 kg (125 lb)

PFC Woman's Lightweight Championship
70 kg (155 lb)

PFC Woman's Featherweight Championship
65 kg (145 lb)

PFC Woman's Bantamweight Championship
61 kg (135 lb)

PFC Woman's Straw-weight Championship
52 kg (115 lb)

PFC Atomweight Championship
48 kg (105 lb)

PFC Light Heavyweight Kickboxing Championship
92 kg (205 lb)

PFC Featherweight Kickboxing Championship
57 kg (145 lb)

Promotional records

Most Fights in the PFC
*All fighters that have fought for the PFC will be included

Most Wins in PFC
*All fighters that have fought for the PFC will be included

Fastest Knockout in the PFC
*All fighters that have fought for the PFC will be included

Fastest Submission in the PFC
*All fighters that have fought for the PFC will be included

Most Finishes in PFC
*All fighters that have fought for the PFC will be included

PFC Event with most finishes
*All PFC events will be included

Notable alumni
Chris Horodecki
Jesse Ronson
Misha Cirkunov
Randa Markos
Kyle Prepolec
Malcolm Gordon
Kyle Nelson
Justin Jaynes
Elias Theodorou
T.J. Laramie
Ryan Healy
Claudio LedesmaTony Laramie

References

External links
 
 https://www.tapology.com/fightcenter/promotions/1596-prospect-amateur-fighting-championships-pafc at Tapology

 
Mixed martial arts organizations
Organizations based in London, Ontario
Sports organizations established in 2013
Companies based in London, Ontario
Mixed martial arts events lists
2013 establishments in Ontario